Loch Street railway station is a railway station on the Transperth network. It is located on the Fremantle and Airport lines, eight kilometres from Perth station serving the suburbs of Claremont, Mount Claremont and Karrakatta.

History
Loch Street station opened in 1954. Its construction was part of the conversion of Perth's passenger train system from steam to diesel power, allowing smaller intervals between stations. On 18 August 2002, Loch Street had its regular services limited due to low passenger numbers, closeness to Karrakatta station (500 metres) and, prior to May 2009, the length of its platforms. The platforms weren't long enough to accommodate four car train sets, resulting in alternate trains skipping the station. Only two car train sets stopped, at night and on weekends. In May 2009, work to extend the platforms was completed.

Since 10 October 2022, the station has been served by Airport line services in addition to the pre-existing Fremantle line services.

Services
Loch Street station is served by the Airport and Fremantle lines on the Transperth network. Services are operated by Transperth Train Operations, a division of the PTA. The Fremantle line runs between Fremantle station and Perth station, continuing past Perth as the Midland line. The Airport line, which commenced regular services on 10 October 2022, goes between High Wycombe station and Claremont station.

Airport line and Fremantle line trains stop at Loch Street every 12 minutes each during peak hour for a combined frequency of a train every 6 minutes. Outside peak hour and on weekends and public holidays, each line has a train every 15 minutes for a combined frequency of 7.5 minutes. Late at night, each line has a half-hourly or hourly frequency.

Loch Street station saw 70,656 passengers in the 2013–14 financial year, making it the second least used station on the Fremantle line, beaten only by its neighbour Karrakatta.

References

Fremantle line
Railway stations in Perth, Western Australia
Railway stations in Australia opened in 1954
Airport line, Perth